USS Frank E. Petersen Jr. (DDG-121) is an  Flight IIA guided missile destroyer in the United States Navy, the 71st overall for the class. The ship was named for United States Marine Corps Lieutenant General Frank E. Petersen Jr. the first African-American Marine Corps aviator and the first African-American Marine Corps general.  The contract for the ship, along with the name, was first announced in a press release from Huntington Ingalls Industries on 30 March 2016.

Construction and Career
The first "cutting of steel" took place in April 2016 and her keel was laid on 21 February 2017. She was launched on 13 July 2018. and christened on 6 October 2018. The ship was commissioned on 14 May 2022 at Charleston, South Carolina.

References

External links

Official website
USMC History Division, Frank E. Petersen Jr.
Marines.mil, Lt. Gen. Frank Petersen remembered, honored
Military Times, Frank E. Petersen – Awards and Citations

 

Arleigh Burke-class destroyers
2018 ships